Hebburn is a Tyne and Wear Metro station, serving the town of Hebburn, South Tyneside in Tyne and Wear, England. It joined the network on 24 March 1984, following the opening of the fifth phase of the network, between Heworth and South Shields.

History
The station was opened on 1 March 1872 by the North Eastern Railway. The station became a Tyneside Electrics station around 1938 and de-electricified in 1963. Following closure for conversion in the early 1980s, the station was demolished and re-built, with staggered platforms on each side of the bridge on Station Road.

Metro Flow 
During the 2020 Budget, the Government announced the £103million Metro Flow scheme. Between September 2022 and December 2022, a full closure of the line between Pelaw and South Shields took place. Three sections of single line were converted to dual line, between Pelaw and Hebburn, Hebburn and Jarrow and Jarrow and Bede (. The project also saw a previously freight-only line electrified and redesigned to operate using a similar system to the existing shared line between Pelaw and Sunderland.

Facilities
Step-free access is available at all stations across the Tyne and Wear Metro network, with ramps providing step-free access to both platforms at Hebburn. The station is equipped with ticket machines, waiting shelter, seating, next train information displays, timetable posters, and an emergency help point on both platforms. Ticket machines are able to accept payment with credit and debit card (including contactless payment), notes and coins. The station is also fitted with smartcard validators, which feature at all stations across the network.

There is a free car park available at the station, with 80 spaces, plus four accessible spaces, as well as a taxi rank. There is also the provision for cycle parking, with five cycle pods available for use.

Services 
, the station is served by up to five trains per hour on weekdays and Saturday, and up to four trains per hour during the evening and on Sunday.

Rolling stock used: Class 599 Metrocar

References

External links

 Timetable and station information for Hebburn

1872 establishments in England
Railway stations in Great Britain opened in 1872
1984 establishments in England
Railway stations in Great Britain opened in 1984
Tyne and Wear Metro Yellow line stations
Transport in Tyne and Wear
Former North Eastern Railway (UK) stations
